Events from the year 1870 in France.

Incumbents
 Monarch – Napoleon III (abdicates 4 September, monarchy abolished)

Events
February - Denis Vrain-Lucas is sentenced to 2 years in prison for multiple forgery, in Paris.
20 April - Constitutional referendum reaffirms the status of the Second French Empire.
14 July - Ems Dispatch published, serving as a casus belli for war between France and Prussia.
15 July - French army mobilizes.
16 July - Corps législatif votes to declare war on Prussia.
19 July - France declares war on Prussia: opening of the Franco-Prussian War.
4 August - Battle of Wissembourg: Prussian forces overwhelm the French garrison at Wissembourg.
6 August
Battle of Spicheren, near Saarbrücken: Prussian victory.
Battle of Wörth: decisive Prussian victory.
14 August - Battle of Borny-Colombey: Prussian victory; French retreat upon Metz.
15 August - Siege of Strasbourg begins.
16 August - Battle of Mars-la-Tour: Prussian victory.
18 August - Battle of Gravelotte: Prussian victory.
30 August - Battle of Beaumont: Prussian victory.
31 August - Battle of Noiseville: Prussian victory.
1–2 September - Battle of Sedan: decisive Prussian victory. Napoleon III surrenders himself and the entire Army of Châlons and declares the Second Empire dissolved.
3 September - Siege of Metz begins with French forces besieged.
4 September - Third Republic declared in Paris. Government of National Defense established. Empress Eugenie flees to England with her son.
19 September - Siege of Paris begins.
27–30 September - Battle of Le Bourget, part of the siege of Paris: Prussian victory.
28 September - Siege of Strasbourg ends with French surrender.
30 September - Battle of Chevilly, part of the siege of Paris: Prussian victory.
8 October - Leon Michel Gambetta escapes besieged Paris in a hot-air balloon.
18 October - Battle of Bellevue, near Metz: Prussian victory.
23 October - Siege of Metz ends with French surrender.
3 November - Siege of Belfort begins with French troops besieged.
9 November - Battle of Coulmiers: French victory over Bavarian forces.
11 November - French retake Orléans.
27 November - Battle of Amiens: Prussian victory.
28 November - Battle of Beaune-la-Rolande: Prussian victory.
29 November - Battle of Villiers, largest of the French sorties from besieged Paris, begins.
2 December - Battle of Loigny-Poupry, Prussian victory.
3 December - Battle of Villiers ends with Prussian victory.
3–4 December - Second Battle of Orléans: Prussians recapture Orléans.
23–24 December - Battle of Hallue results in stalemate.

Arts and literature
February - Sculptor Aimé Millet is appointed professor at the École des Arts décoratifs.
25 May - Léo Delibes' ballet Coppélia debuts at the Théâtre Impérial de l'Opéra at the Salle Le Peletier in Paris.
28 June - Claude Monet marries his mistress and model Camille Doncieux in Paris; Gustave Courbet is a witness.

Births
25 January - Henry Bordeaux, writer and lawyer (died 1963)
28 April - Frédéric Justin Collet, pathologist and otolaryngologist (died 1966)
20 June - Georges Dufrénoy, post-impressionist painter (died 1943)
27 July - Hilaire Belloc, French-born English man of letters (died 1953 in the United Kingdom)
24 September - Georges Claude, engineer, chemist and inventor (died 1960)
30 September - Jean Baptiste Perrin, physicist and Nobel laureate (died 1942)
8 October - Louis Vierne, organist and composer (died 1937)
10 December - Mary Bonaparte, eldest daughter of Prince Napoléon Bonaparte of Canino (died 1947)

Deaths

January to June
19 January - Jean-Baptiste Troppmann, spree killer, executed (born 1849)
1 February - Auguste Regnaud de Saint-Jean d'Angély, Marshal of France (born 1794)
19 February - Nathaniel de Rothschild, founder of the wine-making branch of the Rothschild family (born 1812)
20 June - Jules de Goncourt, writer (born 1830)

July to December
15 August - Ardant du Picq, Colonel and military theorist (born 1819)
2 September - Charles Joseph, comte de Flahaut, general and statesman (born 1785)
23 September - Prosper Mérimée, dramatist, historian and archaeologist (born 1803)
25 October - Etienne-Michel Faillon, Roman Catholic historian (born 1800)
28 October - Jean-Pierre Falret, psychiatrist (born 1794)
29 October - Jules Baroche, statesman and Minister (born 1802)
24 November - Comte de Lautréamont, poet (born 1846 in Uruguay)
28 November - Frédéric Bazille, painter, killed in action (born 1841)
5 December - Alexandre Dumas, père, writer (born 1802)
26 December - Marie Dominique Bouix, Jesuit canon lawyer (born 1808)

Full date unknown
Jacques-François Ochard, painter (born 1800)

References

1870s in France